A Storm of Light is an American heavy metal band from New York City, formed in 2008.

They have been categorized as post-rock, post-metal, doom metal, sludge metal and hard rock, but have moved toward a darker and heavier metal sound. Rock-A-Rolla magazine's review of Nations to Flames states: "In upping the aggression, intensity and songwriting ability, they are once again overshadowing what's gone before and giving new reasons to appreciate a band that are already becoming one of the most crucial heavy acts around."

History 
A Storm of Light was founded in 2008 by bassist Domenic Seita and vocalist/guitarist/keyboardist Josh Graham. Graham is a former member of the post-rock outfit Red Sparowes, songwriter in Battle of Mice, and a longtime visual artist in residence with Neurosis (2000–2012) and Soundgarden (since 2010). From 2011, drummer Billy Graves has completed the permanent lineup.

Members

Current
 Josh Graham – guitar, vocals, keyboards
 Domenic Seita – bass
 Billy Graves – drums (As the Valley of Death Becomes Us, Our Silver Memories Fade & Nations to Flames)

Former
 Pete Angevice – drums (We Wept the Black Ocean Within)
 Andy Rice – drums (Forgive Us Our Trespasses)
 Vinnie Signorelli – drums (Primitive North)

Discography

Albums
 And We Wept the Black Ocean Within (2008, Neurot Recordings)
 "Primitive North" Split with Nadja (2009)
 Forgive Us Our Trespasses (2009)
 As the Valley of Death Becomes Us, Our Silver Memories Fade (2011, Profound Lore)
 Nations to Flames (2013, Southern Lord)
 Anthroscene (2018, Translation Loss Records)

References

External links

Official website

American doom metal musical groups
American sludge metal musical groups
American post-metal musical groups
American post-rock groups
Heavy metal musical groups from New York (state)
Hard rock musical groups from New York (state)
American musical trios
Musical groups established in 2008
2008 establishments in New York (state)